Fazle Kaderi Mohammad Abdul Munim (known as FKMA Munim; 1 December 1924 – 16 February 2001) was a Bangladeshi jurist served as the 4th Chief Justice of Bangladesh and the former chief of Bangladesh Law Commission.

Early life
Munim was born on 1 December 1924 in Dhaka, East Bengal, British India. In 1951, he joined the Dhaka High Court Bar. he finished his LLM and Ph.D. degrees from the University of London in 1960. His father was Mohammed Abdul Khalique, a retired Deputy Magistrate living in Lalbagh, Dhaka. Munim's paternal uncle was the Bengali poet Kaykobad.

Career
In 1964, Munim started his practice as an advocate of the Supreme Court of Pakistan. He was a member of both the provincial East Pakistan Bar Council and the national Pakistan Bar Council. In 1970, he was made the Advocate General of East Pakistan. In 1970, he became a judge of Dhaka High Court. After the Independence of Bangladesh, he then became a judge in the high court of Bangladesh. He worked on the drafting of the constitution of Bangladesh.

In 1976, Munim was made a judge in the Supreme court of Bangladesh. He was made the Chief Justice of Bangladesh in 1982 and retired from his post in November 1989. On 6 August 1996, he was made the chairman of Bangladesh Law Commission. He resigned from the commission on 31 December 1997 citing health reasons.

Personal life 
Munim's spouse was Syeda Nurunnahar. They had five sons and one daughter who passed away in childhood.

References 

1924 births
2001 deaths
Alumni of the University of London
Supreme Court of Bangladesh justices
Chief justices of Bangladesh